The praefectus castrorum ("camp prefect") was, in the Roman army of the early Empire, the third most senior officer of the Roman legion after the legate (legatus) and the senior military tribune (tribunus laticlavius), both of whom were from the senatorial class. He was responsible for training, equipment procurement and maintenance, and construction of the camp, but he could command the legion when his seniors were absent. The post was usually held by a soldier promoted from the centurionate, having already served as a chief centurion (primus pilus) of a legion, and was therefore open to ordinary, plebeian citizens.  Prefects of this rank, for example Sextus Vibius Gallus, were awarded prizes (dona) to mark their achievements.

See also

Military logistics
Praefectus
Stratopedarches

References

Military ranks of ancient Rome